A mastiff is one of a number of breeds of large dog.

It may also refer to:
, eight Royal Navy vessels serving between 1797 and 1939
Tadiran Mastiff, a battlefield unmanned aerial vehicle (UAV) built by Tadiran Electronic Industries
Mastiff PPV, British Army designation for the Cougar armoured fighting vehicle, with extra armour
Mastiff (company), an American video game company
Mastiff (novel), a 2011 fantasy novel by Tamora Pierce